Big Pig is the debut self-titled extended play (EP) by Australian indie pop band Big Pig, released independently in May 1986.

The EP was re-released following the band's signing to Mushroom's White Label Records.

At the ARIA Music Awards of 1987, the EP won the ARIA Award for Best Cover Art.

Track listing
 Original release

 White Label re-release

Release history

References

1986 debut EPs
Indie pop EPs
Synth-pop EPs
EPs by Australian artists
Big Pig albums
ARIA Award-winning albums